The 1st Infantry Battalion is one of the three infantry battalions, along with the b2k and b3k, part of the Albanian Land Force. The b1k it is based in Vau i Dejës, Shkodër County. It consists on 3 companies, with 100 – 130 soldiers each, with a total of about 700 effective as a whole battalion. Normally they fall under the command of Land Force Command and Staff.

See also
 Albanian Armed Forces
 Albanian Land Force
 Albanian Naval Force
 Albanian Air Force

References

Military units and formations of Albania